Gregory Lamarr Kindle (born September 16, 1950) is a former American football offensive lineman who played four seasons in the National Football League (NFL) with the St. Louis Cardinals and Atlanta Falcons. He was drafted by the Cardinals in the second round of the 1974 NFL Draft. He played college football at Tennessee State University and attended Wheatley High School in Houston, Texas. Kindle was also a member of the Winnipeg Blue Bombers of the Canadian Football League.

References

External links
Just Sports Stats

Living people
1950 births
Players of American football from Houston
Players of Canadian football from Houston
American football offensive linemen
Canadian football offensive linemen
African-American players of American football
African-American players of Canadian football
Tennessee State Tigers football players
St. Louis Cardinals (football) players
Atlanta Falcons players
Winnipeg Blue Bombers players
21st-century African-American people
20th-century African-American sportspeople